The Central Finland Province was a province of Finland from 1960 to 1997. The area of the Central Finland Province was the same as the area of Central Finland region.

The Central Finland Province was established in 1960 when it was separated from the Vaasa Province. Minor parts of Häme Province, Kuopio Province and Mikkeli Province were also merged to the new province. In 1997 it was reunited with Vaasa and together with the northern part of the Häme Province and the Turku and Pori Province it was merged into the new Western Finland Province.

Maps

Municipalities in 1997 (cities in bold) 

Hankasalmi
Joutsa
Jyväskylä
Jyväskylän mlk
Jämsä
Jämsänkoski
Kannonkoski
Karstula
Keuruu
Kinnula
Kivijärvi
Konnevesi
Korpilahti
Kuhmoinen
Kyyjärvi
Laukaa
Leivonmäki
Luhanka
Multia
Muurame
Petäjävesi
Pihtipudas
Pylkönmäki
Saarijärvi
Sumiainen
Suolahti
Toivakka
Uurainen
Viitasaari
Äänekoski

Former municipalities (disestablished before 1997) 
Konginkangas
Koskenpää
Pihlajavesi
Säynätsalo
Äänekosken mlk

Governors 

 Eino Palovesi 1960–1972
 Artturi Jämsén 1972–1976
 Kauko Sipponen 1976–1985
 Kalevi Kivistö 1985–1997

Provinces of Finland (1917–97)
States and territories established in 1960